
The following is a list of Playboy Playmates of 2017. Playboy magazine names their Playmate of the Month each month throughout the year.

The decision in 2016 to stop showing playmates with full frontal nudity was reversed in the March/April 2017 issue.

January

Bridget Malcolm is an Australian model and the Playboy Playmate of the Month for January 2017 and her pictorial was shot by Jason Lee Parry.

February

Joy Elizabeth Corrigan is an American model and the Playboy Playmate of the Month for February 2017.

March

Elizabeth Victoria Elam is a model and the Playboy Playmate of the month for March 2017.

April

Nina Marie Daniele is an American model and the Playboy Playmate of the Month for April 2017.

May

Lada Kravchenko is the Playboy Playmate of the Month for May 2017.

June

Elsie Rose Hewitt is the Playboy Playmate of Month for June 2017.

July

Dana Taylor is the Playboy Playmate of Month for July 2017.

August

Liza Kei is the Playboy Playmate of Month for August 2017. She first appeared in the magazine on the cover of the March 2013 issue.

September

Jessica Wall is the Playboy Playmate of Month for September 2017.

October

Milan Dixon is the Playboy Playmate of Month for October 2017.

November

Ines Rau is the Playboy Playmate of the Month for November 2017. She is the first transgender Playmate and the second transgender model to appear in the magazine, as Caroline Cossey was featured in the September 1991 issue.

December

Allie Leggett is the Playboy Playmate of the Month for December 2017.

See also
 List of people in Playboy 2010–2019

References 

 2017
Playmates of 2017
2017-related lists